Cooking Live is an American television cooking show on Food Network. Hosted by Sara Moulton, the show was broadcast live daily and featured Moulton preparing various dishes and taking calls from viewers.

References 

Food Network original programming
1990s American cooking television series
2000s American cooking television series
1997 American television series debuts
2003 American television series endings